The Accident Investigation Bureau (AIB) investigates aircraft accidents and incidents in Nigeria. It is headquartered on the grounds of Nnamdi Azikiwe International Airport in Abuja.

The agency reports to the President of Nigeria through the Federal Minister of Aviation. The agency's Commissioner, who is also the Chief Executive Officer, is Engr. Akin Olateru.

In September 2020 the Federal Executive Council approved the establishment of AIB Training School in Nigeria.

History
Previously the Ministry of Aviation Civil Aviation Department investigated aircraft accidents. In 1989, the Federal Civil Aviation Authority (FCAA) was formed, and the Civil Aviation Department of the MOA became the FCAA Department of Safety Services. During the same year the Accident Investigation Bureau (AIB), subordinate to the Ministry of Aviation, was established, and the FCAA no longer had accident investigation responsibilities. The name of the bureau was later changed to the Accident Investigation and Prevention Bureau. As part of the Civil Aviation Act of 2006, the AIB became an autonomous agency and renamed Accident Investigation Bureau.

References

External links

 Accident Investigation Bureau

Government of Nigeria
Aviation organizations based in Nigeria
Nigeria
2006 establishments in Nigeria
Government agencies established in 2006
Organizations based in Lagos
Government agencies and parastatals of Lagos State